Days of Thunder is a 1990 NASCAR racing simulation video game loosely based on the 1990 movie Days of Thunder. The game utilized elements from the movie, using a movie license from Paramount Pictures for its graphical elements, plot, and music soundtrack. It was released for the PC, the NES, the Game Boy, and many other formats. It was created by Argonaut Software and distributed by Mindscape Group.  In 2009 Freeverse released an updated version for iOS.

Gameplay

In the PC version, gameplay consisted of setting up the car, qualifying, and then the actual race event. If the player finished in a high enough position, they would progress to the next circuit. Damage was calculated not by realistic damage displayed on the car but a "cracked dashboard" bar indicator, with cracks appearing along the dashboard when the player hits something (the same as that used in the 1989 release Stunt Car Racer).

Development
Prior to the version developed by Beam Software, a version of the game was in development at Mindscape by Chris Oberth. At some point, Oberth's version was cancelled and the work transferred to Beam Software. Oberth's version was recovered from floppy discs in 2020 after his death by the Video Game History Foundation and its source code was made available in June with permission of Oberth's estate.

Additional versions of Beam Software's game were ported to the PC in 1990 and to the Game Boy in 1992.

Reception
 According to website Lemon64, Commodore 64 magazine Zzap!64 gave the C64 version of Days of Thunder a 52 out of 100.

See also
Days of Thunder (2011)

References

External links

Source code for an unreleased NES version at Video Game History Foundation

1990 video games
Amiga games
Argonaut Games games
Atari ST games
Commodore 64 games
DOS games
Game Boy games
IOS games
NASCAR video games
Nintendo Entertainment System games
Video games based on films
Video games developed in Australia
Video games developed in the United Kingdom
Video games scored by David Whittaker
ZX Spectrum games
Commercial video games with freely available source code
Simulation video games
Mindscape games
Multiplayer and single-player video games
Tiertex Design Studios games